Russ Taff is the self-titled third album by Christian singer/songwriter Russ Taff, released in late 1987 on Myrrh/Word Records. Taff covers two songs: "Down in the Lowlands" by Charlie Peacock and "I Still Believe" by the Call, plus a 40-second snippet of the American negro spiritual "Steal Away". Taff also records "Breathe Life into Me", which would later be a UK Top 30 hit and US R&B hitin 1988–1989 by British singer Mica Paris. Russ Taff reached number two on the Billboard Top Inspirational Albums chart. The album won a GMA Dove Award for Rock Album of the Year at the 20th GMA Dove Awards and earned Taff a Grammy nomination for Best Gospel Performance, Male at the 31st Annual Grammy Awards.

Track listing

Personnel 
 Russ Taff – lead vocals, backing vocals (3, 8, 11)
 Robbie Buchanan – synthesizers (1-6, 8-11), acoustic piano (2, 3, 5, 11), Hammond B3 organ (3, 11), PPG bass (5)
 Greg Husted – Hammond B3 organ (1, 6)
 Eric Persing – synthesizer programming (2)
 Alan Pasqua – synthesizers (3, 4, 6)
 James Hollihan – guitars (1, 3-6, 8-11), slide guitar solo (5), acoustic slide guitar (7), acoustic piano (8), guitar solo (9, 10, 11), acoustic guitar (11)
 Lynn Nichols – acoustic guitar (1)
 Dave Perkins – acoustic guitar (1), guitars (1, 2, 6), guitar solo (1), backing vocals (2, 11), additional synthesizers (2)
 Dann Huff – guitars (2-5, 9, 10)
 Neil Stubenhaus – bass (1, 2, 6, 9)
 Mike Brignardello – bass (3, 11)
 Nathan East – bass (4, 10)
 Jackie Street – bass (8)
 Mel Watts – drums (1, 6, 8)
 Scott Musick – drums (2, 9)
 Paul Leim – drums (3, 4, 5, 10, 11)
 Lenny Castro – percussion (1, 4, 5, 8, 11)
 Koji Egawa – door percussion (4)
 Joe Porcaro – timpani (5)
 Jeff Porcaro – hi-hat (6)
 Mark Douthit – sax solo (3), soprano saxophone (4), saxophone (8, 9)
 Clarice Devisschu – backing vocals (4)
 Vince Ebo – backing vocals (4, 9)
 Charlie Peacock – backing vocals (4, 9)
 Rebecca Sparks – backing vocals (4)
 Jack Joseph Puig – ethnic vocals (4)
 Mark Williamson – backing vocals (6, 8, 10)
 Annie Stocking – backing vocals (9)

The 'Boys Choir' on This Love is Strong"
 James Hollihan, Lynn Nichols, Greg Sparks, Russ Taff, Steve Taylor and Mark Williamson 

Chant on "(Living on the) Edge of Time"
 James Hollihan, Lynn Nichols, Dave Perkins, Jack Joseph Puig and Russ Taff

Production 
 Lynn Nichols – executive producer, cover design concept 
 Jack Joseph Puig – producer, recording, mixing 
 Steve Ford – assistant engineer 
 Koji Egawa – assistant engineer 
 Wade Jaynes – assistant engineer 
 Julie Last – assistant engineer 
 Bert Stevens – assistant engineer 
 Billy Whittington – assistant engineer 
 Steve Hazelton – technical assistance
 Mike Wambsgans – technical assistance
 Doug Sax – mastering at The Mastering Lab (Hollywood, California)
 Joan Tankersley – art direction, cover design concept, logo design 
 Patrick Pollei – logo design 
 Phillip Dixon – photography 
 Zack Glickman – management

Charts

Radio singles

Accolades
GMA Dove Awards

References

1987 albums
Russ Taff albums
Myrrh Records albums
Word Records albums